The Transitway is a bus rapid transit (BRT) network operated by OC Transpo in Ottawa, Ontario, Canada. It comprises a series of bus-only roadways and reserved lanes on city streets and highways. The dedicated busways ensure that buses and emergency vehicles on the Transitway rarely intersect directly with the regular traffic, and make it possible for them to continue at full speed even during rush hour. OC Transpo operates a network of rapid routes which use the Transitway to connect communities with the O-Train light rail system. Additional bus routes also use segments of the Transitway.

The Transitway opened in 1983 with five stations. The network expanded greatly to include over fifty stations at its peak. Beginning in 2015, segments of the Transitway were closed to be converted to light rail. Ottawa's Stage 2 and 3 O-Train expansions will see additional segments of the Transitway converted.

History

During the 1970s and 1980s, the Regional Municipality of Ottawa-Carleton approved the construction of a new transit corridor called the Transitway. The purpose of this busway was to increase the speed of city-bound services from east and west. The first two sections opened in 1983: the southwestern Transitway between Lincoln Fields and Baseline and the east between Lees and Hurdman.

The central Transitway was then added in the Westboro and Mechanicsville areas. In the downtown core, buses traveled along dedicated lanes on Albert and Slater streets. The eastern Transitway was extended in both directions, towards Laurier in the northwest and Blair in the east. These segments of the Transitway were serviced by route 95, travelling the full length of the Transitway from Baseline to Blair. Priority measures were later added to Woodroffe Avenue and Regional Road 174, extending service into the suburbs of Barrhaven and Orleans.

In the 1990s, a rail corridor was gradually converted into the southeast Transitway, spanning from Hurdman to South Keys. This new section necessitated the creation of route 97. Route 97 followed the new southwest Transitway before joining route 95 along the existing Transitway segments. The 97 was extended to service the suburb of Kanata. The Kanata section was later split off into route 96.

In 2001, the O-Train's Trillium Line (then simply the "O-Train") opened. Its northern terminus was at the new Bayview station on the central Transitway and its southern terminus at Greenboro on the southeast Transitway.

The southwest Transitway was gradually extended southward, first to Fallowfield in 2005 and then to Barrhaven Centre in 2011. A median busway section was added along Chapman Mills Drive to Nepean Woods in 2014. The first segment of the western Transitway opened in 2009 connecting Pinecrest and Bayshore. This was extended to Moodie in 2017.

Beginning in 2015, sections of the Transitway closed for conversion to light rail for the Confederation Line. Buses were rerouted to bus-only lanes along Highway 417, Regional Road 174, and city streets. The Confederation Line opened in 2019, along with a major re-organization of the Transitway network. Rapid routes no longer travelled through downtown Ottawa. Instead, all rapid routes use the Transitway to connect communities to the Confederation Line at one of three stations: Tunney's Pasture, Hurdman, or Blair. Routes were also renumbered to correspond with their geographic service area, resulting in the retirement of route 95, the Transitway's busiest and oldest route.

Multiple sections of the Transitway were permanently closed for O-Train Stage 2 construction in 2021 and 2022. In September of 2021, the Transitway was closed between Moodie and Bayshore, followed by the section between Bayshore and Pinecrest in April of 2022. Buses were detoured along Highway 417, with Moodie station being relocated to temporary bus stops at the interchange ramps, and some bus routes bypassing Pinecrest and Bayshore stations eastbound as a result. In June, the entirety of the central Transitway between Tunney's Pasture and Dominion stations was closed, as well as the southwest Transitway between Iris and Baseline. Buses were detoured along Scott Street parallel to the former central Transitway, with a temporary extension and bridge connecting to Dominion Station. Buses were routed along Iris Street and Woodroffe Avenue between Iris and Baseline stations.

Routes
The following are OC Transpo's rapid routes, which travel along the Transitway with frequent service connecting communities to the O-Train. Additional OC Transpo routes also use segments of the Transitway.

Stations and segments

East

The east Transitway currently consists of a series of intermittent bus-only lanes along Regional Road 174 between Blair and Place d'Orléans.

Southeast

The southeast Transitway is a dedicated busway adjacent to some rail corridors between Hurdman and South Keys.

Central

The central Transitway was a dedicated busway between Tunney's Pasture and Dominion. It was closed in preparation for O-Train Stage 2 construction in June 2022, with buses now running along Scott Street. A temporary Transitway was built from Dominion station to the intersection of Churchill Road and Scott Street. The new Transitway travels over the old one via the bailey bridge and then alongside until the intersection of Scott /Churchill.

Downtown 
The former downtown section of the Transitway consisted of two single bus-only lanes on Albert and Slater Streets (one-way public streets in opposite westbound and eastbound directions, respectively), with stops in each direction at Bay, Kent, Bank and Metcalfe Streets as well as on the Mackenzie King Bridge. Traffic congestion here, where the buses mingle with private vehicles, often caused service delays and was seen by some as the main weakness in the Transitway system.

Initial plans for the Transitway included a bus-only tunnel in this section but the cost of a ventilated tunnel for conventional buses was deemed too expensive and was not warranted at the time. In 2006, it was proposed to extend the O-Train downtown as a tramway over the same streets while keeping existing bus and car traffic. The idea was met with objections from businesses along those streets, as normal access to the businesses would be impeded.

In 2019, the Confederation Line opened, replacing the downtown portion of the Transitway with an underground, high-capacity rapid transit rail line. This service change greatly reduced the number of buses travelling on Albert and Slater streets.

Southwest

The southwest Transitway includes a dedicated busway from Lincoln Fields to Baseline. Buses then travel on reserved lanes before joining a busway before Fallowfield. This busway extends from Fallowfield to Barrhaven Centre. A separate median busway east of Marketplace connects Beatrice and Nepean Woods before traveling along reserved lanes to Riverview.

West

The west Transitway consisted of a dedicated busway between Pinecrest and Moodie, however the section between Moodie and Bayshore closed permanently in September 2021, followed by the section between Bayshore and Pinecrest in April 2022. Buses also use reserved lanes on Highway 417 between Moodie and Eagleson.

See also
O-Train, OC Transpo's light rail transit system

Other bus rapid transit systems in Ontario
Viva Rapid Transit
Mississauga Transitway
York University Busway

References

External links

 List of all Transitway stations and map

OC Transpo
Busways
Bus rapid transit in Canada
1983 establishments in Ontario
Bus transport in Ottawa
Transitway (Ottawa)